Mercury 3 or variants may refer to:

 Mercury 3, a spacecraft of Project Mercury
 Mercury(III), an unknown compound of the element Mercury
 Mercury III, a version of the Blackburn Mercury early British aircraft
 Mercury III, a 1929 version of the Bristol Mercury aircraft engine

See also
 Mercury (disambiguation)
Mercury-Redstone 3, the first U.S. human spaceflight, 1961
Mercury-Atlas 3, a 1961 unmanned space flight